The Warrnambool Football Netball Club, nicknamed the Blues, is an Australian rules football and netball club based in the city of the same name. Warrnambool teams compete in the Hampden Football Netball League, where the football squad has played since 1933.

History
The origins of the clubs can be traced back to 1861, when a  "football"  match was played in Warrnambool. The club was formed shortly after, being one of the oldest football clubs in Australia.

In 1913 the club won its first premiership, playing in the Western District Football Association. Warrnambool entered into recess in 1915 due to World War I, returning to action in 1920 under the named "Warrnambool City". In 1924, the club merged with South Warrnambool to form "Warrnambool FC", winning flags in 1924 and 1927. Nevertheless, the club divided again in 1928, with Warrnambool City reverting to its original name.

The Blues switched to the Hampden Football League, where the club achieved a large success, winning no less than one premiership per decade. Warrnambool also claimed a hat trick of flags, accomplishing that honor twice.

Football Premierships

Seniors
 Western District Football Association (2) 
1913, 1914
 Warrnambool District and Corangamite Football Association (1) 
1924
 Western District Football League (2) 
1927, 1931
 Hampden Football League (23): 
1935, 1937, 1939, 1946, 1947, 1957, 1959, 1960, 1962, 1963, 1966, 1976, 1977, 1978, 1984, 1986, 1987, 1988, 1989, 1992, 2001, 2002, 2010

Reserves
Hampden Football League
1977,
Thirds
Hampden Football League
1966,

Football League - Best & Fairest Winners
Seniors
Hampden Football League - Maskell Medallists
1951 - Don Grossman 
1953 - John O'Neill 
1962 - Bill McConnell 
1977 - Tony Hills 
1993 - Chris Grumley
2000 - Paul Jenkinson 
2003 - Nick Hider 
2009 - Josh Walters 
2011 - Rhys Raymond 
2012 - Tim Hunt 

Reserves

VFL / AFL Players
The following footballers played with Warrnambool FC prior to their senior VFL / AFL football debut. 

1897 - Ned Officer - Essendon
1902 - Alec McKenzie - Geelong
1912 - Percy Martyn - St. Kilda
1919 - George Threlfall - Richmond
1920 - Billy Sarll - St. Kilda
1921 - Laurie Murphy - Collingwood
1928 - Len McConnell - North Melbourne
1934 - Dick Harris Richmond
1936 - Nick Muller - Geelong
1938 - Les Begley - Essendon
1943 - Bill Brittingham Essendon
1947 - Harry Somerville - North Melbourne

1951 - Ron Walker - South Melbourne
1952 - Harry Herbert - Geelong
1953 - Gerry McDonald - South Melbourne
1955 - Geoff Umbers - Geelong
1967 - Robert Hando - South Melbourne
1974 - Neville Taylor - Fitzroy
1974 - Michael Turner Geelong
1975 - John Lewis - Fitzroy
1985 - Paul Couch Geelong
2005 - Jordan Lewis Hawthorn
2007 - Simon Hogan - Geelong

Notes

References

External links

 Official website
1956 - Warrnambool FC Team Photo

Sports clubs established in 1861
Australian rules football clubs established in 1861
Sport in Warrnambool
1861 establishments in Australia
Hampden Football League clubs
Netball teams in Victoria (Australia)